Trilogy is the third studio album by English progressive rock band Emerson, Lake & Palmer, released in June 1972, by Island Records. The group had spent most of 1971 touring, which paused in September so they could record a new album at Advision Studios with Eddy Offord resuming his role as engineer. The album features "Hoedown", an arrangement of Aaron Copland's ballet composition which became a live favourite.

The album was a commercial success, reaching No. 2 on the UK Albums Chart and No. 5 on the US Billboard 200. Lake's acoustic song, "From the Beginning", was released as a single in August 1972 and became the band's highest charting US single, reaching No. 39. Lake picked Trilogy as his favourite Emerson, Lake & Palmer album.

Recording
In September 1971, the band took a break in their touring promoting Tarkus (1971) and Pictures at an Exhibition (1971) to start work on a new studio album. They returned to Advision Studios in London, once again with Lake as producer and Eddy Offord as their engineer. In early 1972, New Musical Express falsely reported that the group were splitting up, causing the band to issue a statement. Keyboardist Keith Emerson had planned to do a solo album of jazz music, but the project was shelved and the band turned down a lucrative offer to write the score to a racing film entitled Fangio. The band recorded the album in October-November 1971 and January 1972.

The album was particularly difficult for Lake to record, as he described the album as "such an accurate record." Palmer noted Trilogy had the most number of overdubs put down on an Emerson, Lake & Palmer album, owing to the "enormous detail" put into the arrangements of the songs. Emerson was pleased with the album after it was completed, noting its varied and difference in style compared to Tarkus.

References to a quad version of this album appeared in 1974 Harrison or Schwann record and tape guides, listing Trilogy in the Quadraphonic 8-track tape cartridge format. Collectors report never seeing a Trilogy Q8 at retail, despite its having a catalogue number "Cotillion QT-9903".

Songs

Side one
"The Endless Enigma" is a suite in three parts; the first section begins with the sound of a beating heart, an effect sometimes claimed to have been created by the Ludwig Speed King bass drum pedal of Palmer's Ludwig Octaplus kit. However, in the sleeve notes to the 2015 CD/DVD reissue, remix engineer Jakko Jakszyk is quoted as saying "I've discovered [it is] actually Greg playing... muted strings on his bass guitar".

More often appearing in ELP compilations than live concerts, the track lent its name to a 1997 retrospective of Greg Lake's work. 

"The Sheriff" was written as a prelude to the country-themed "Hoedown", which closes the side. During the opening drum solo, Palmer accidentally hit the rim of his tom-tom with a drumstick, and he can be heard responding with "Shit!". The song ends with a honky tonk-type piano solo with Palmer playing woodblocks.

"Hoedown" is an arrangement of "Hoe-Down" from the ballet Rodeo (1942) by American composer Aaron Copland, who gave the band permission to adapt the piece. It became a live favourite, and opened the band's shows between 1972 and 1974.

Side two
"Abaddon's Bolero" sounds like a bolero turned into a march (in 4/4 rhythm rather than the usual 3/4). The piece was originally titled Bellona's Bolero after the goddess of war. A single melody containing multiple modulations within itself is repeated over and over in ever more thickly layered arrangements, starting from a quiet Hammond organ making a flute-like sound over a snare drum, and building up to a wall of sound – Maurice Ravel's famous Boléro uses a similar effect. There is also a quote from the British traditional song "The Girl I Left Behind". "Abaddon's Bolero" is replete with overdubs. Almost every time an instrument comes in, another overdub follows. "Abaddon's Bolero" was only played live a handful of times, with Greg Lake handling Mellotron, bass pedals, and additional Moog synthesizer duties (other synth parts accompanied them from a reel-to-reel tape playing off-stage which Emerson had pre-recorded); the song turned out to be a disaster, and led to a heated backstage argument when the tape stopped mid-way through the song during one show, after which, it was cut from the set list. The band brought the piece back for the start of their 1977 tour, during which they were accompanied by an orchestra.

Cover

The artwork was designed by Hipgnosis. It depicts a combined  bust of the three members, while the interior of the original gatefold sleeve features a photomontage of the three in Epping Forest. Spanish artist Salvador Dalí was approached to design it, but he requested $50,000 to do it and was subsequently turned down. The front cover depicts each of the band members' faces; Emerson said this was so as their previous albums had not featured them.

Reception

Billboard praised the album for Keith Emerson's "steady progression" on the Moog synthesizer.

Reissues
The album has been reissued a number of times, the most recent was part of a deluxe edition release campaign by Sony Record Group on the 27 April 2015. The original mix was included along with a brand new stereo mix across two CDs and featuring both on an audio DVD.

Track listing

2015 deluxe edition

Personnel
Credits are adapted from the album's 1972 liner notes.

Emerson, Lake & Palmer
Keith Emerson – Hammond C3 organ, Steinway piano, zurna (listed as a "Zoukra"), Moog synthesiser III-C, Mini-Moog model D synthesiser
Greg Lake – vocals, bass guitar, electric and acoustic guitars
Carl Palmer – drums, percussion

Production
Eddy Offord – production engineer
Greg Lake - production
Hipgnosis – cover design and photography
Phil Crinnell – tinting

Singles
"From the Beginning" / "Living Sin" (USA release)

Charts

Weekly charts

Year-end charts

Certifications

External Link

 The T'rilogy Book

References

Emerson, Lake & Palmer albums
1972 albums
Albums produced by Greg Lake
Albums with cover art by Hipgnosis
Island Records albums
Atlantic Records albums
Cotillion Records albums